Cosmisoma viridescens is a species of beetle in the family Cerambycidae. It was described by Galileo & Martins in 2010.

References

Cosmisoma
Beetles described in 2010